Richard Parry Williams (born 1863) was a Welsh international footballer. He was part of the Wales national football team, playing 1 match on 10  April 1886 against Scotland .

References

Welsh footballers
Wales international footballers
Association footballers not categorized by position
1863 births
Place of birth missing
Year of death missing